Akuliarutsip Sermerssua, also known as Nordenskiöld Glacier,, is a large glacier located on the east coast of Greenland.

Geography

See also
List of glaciers in Greenland

References

Glaciers of Greenland

ceb:Akuliarutsip Sermerssua (suba sa yelo sa Greenland)
nl:Nordenskiöldgletsjer
sv:Akuliarutsip Sermerssua (glaciär i Grönland)